Bismuth compounds are compounds containing the element bismuth (Bi). Bismuth forms trivalent and pentavalent compounds, the trivalent ones being more common. Many of its chemical properties are similar to those of arsenic and antimony, although they are less toxic than derivatives of those lighter elements.

Oxides and sulfides 

At elevated temperatures, the vapors of the metal combine rapidly with oxygen, forming the yellow trioxide, . When molten, at temperatures above 710 °C, this oxide corrodes any metal oxide and even platinum.

The dark red bismuth(V) oxide, is unstable, liberating  gas upon heating. The compound NaBiO3 is a strong oxidising agent.

Bismuth sulfide, occurs naturally in bismuth ores. It is also produced by the combination of molten bismuth and sulfur.

Bismuth oxychloride (BiOCl, see figure at right) and bismuth oxynitrate (BiONO3) stoichiometrically appear as simple anionic salts of the bismuthyl(III) cation (BiO+) which commonly occurs in aqueous bismuth compounds. However, in the case of BiOCl, the salt crystal forms in a structure of alternating plates of Bi, O, and Cl atoms, with each oxygen coordinating with four bismuth atoms in the adjacent plane. This mineral compound is used as a pigment and cosmetic (see below).

Bismuthine and bismuthides 

Unlike the lighter pnictogens nitrogen, phosphorus, and arsenic, but similar to antimony, bismuth does not form a stable hydride. Bismuth hydride, bismuthine, is an endothermic compound that spontaneously decomposes at room temperature. It is stable only below −60 °C. Bismuthides are intermetallic compounds between bismuth and other metals.

In 2014 researchers discovered that sodium bismuthide can exist as a form of matter called a “three-dimensional topological Dirac semi-metal” (3DTDS) that possess 3D Dirac fermions in bulk. It is a natural, three-dimensional counterpart to graphene with similar electron mobility and velocity. Graphene and topological insulators (such as those in 3DTDS) are both crystalline materials that are electrically insulating inside but conducting on the surface, allowing them to function as transistors and other electronic devices. While sodium bismuthide is too unstable to be used in devices without packaging, it can demonstrate potential applications of 3DTDS systems, which offer distinct efficiency and fabrication advantages over planar graphene in semiconductor and spintronics applications.

Halides 

The halides of bismuth in low oxidation states have been shown to adopt unusual structures. What was originally thought to be bismuth(I) chloride, BiCl, turns out to be a complex compound consisting of Bi cations and BiCl and BiCl anions. Bismuth also forms a low-valence bromide with the same structure as "BiCl". There is a true monoiodide, BiI, which contains chains of  units. BiI decomposes upon heating to the triiodide, and elemental bismuth. A monobromide of the same structure also exists.
All of these except  are hydrolyzed by water.

Bismuth(III) chloride reacts with hydrogen chloride in ether solution to produce the acid .

The oxidation state +5 is less frequently encountered. It is also a strong fluoride acceptor, reacting with xenon tetrafluoride to form the  cation:

  +  →

Aqueous species 

In aqueous solution, the Bi ion is solvated to form the aqua ion  in strongly acidic conditions. At pH > 0 polynuclear species exist, the most important of which is believed to be the octahedral complex [].

Applications 

 Bismuth is included in BSCCO (bismuth strontium calcium copper oxide) which is a group of similar superconducting compounds discovered in 1988 that exhibit the highest superconducting transition temperatures.
 Bismuth subnitrate is a component of glazes that produces an iridescence and is used as a pigment in paint.
 Bismuth telluride is a semiconductor and an excellent thermoelectric material. Bi2Te3 diodes are used in mobile refrigerators, CPU coolers, and as detectors in infrared spectrophotometers.
 Bismuth oxide, in its delta form, is a solid electrolyte for oxygen. This form normally breaks down below a high-temperature threshold, but can be electrodeposited well below this temperature in a highly alkaline solution.
 Bismuth germanate is a scintillator, widely used in X-ray and gamma ray detectors.
 Bismuth vanadate is an opaque yellow pigment used by some artists' oil, acrylic, and watercolor paint companies, primarily as a replacement for the more toxic cadmium sulfide yellows in the greenish-yellow (lemon) to orange-toned yellow range. It performs practically identically to the cadmium pigments, such as in terms of resistance to degradation from UV exposure, opacity, tinting strength, and lack of reactivity when mixed with other pigments. The most commonly-used variety by artists' paint makers is lemon in color. In addition to being a replacement for several cadmium yellows, it also serves as a non-toxic visual replacement for the older chromate pigments made with zinc, lead, and strontium. If a green pigment and barium sulfate (for increased transparency) are added it can also serve as a replacement for barium chromate, which possesses a more greenish cast than the others. In comparison with lead chromates, it does not blacken due to hydrogen sulfide in the air (a process accelerated by UV exposure) and possesses a particularly brighter color than them, especially the lemon, which is the most translucent, dull, and fastest to blacken due to the higher percentage of lead sulfate required to produce that shade. It is also used, on a limited basis due to its cost, as a vehicle paint pigment.
 A catalyst for making acrylic fibers.
 As an electrocatalyst in the conversion of CO2 to CO.
 Ingredient in lubricating greases.
 In crackling microstars (dragon's eggs) in pyrotechnics, as the oxide, subcarbonate or subnitrate.
As catalyst for the fluorination of arylboronic pinacol esters through a Bi(III)/Bi(V) catalytic cycle, mimicking transition metals in electrophilic fluorination.

See also 

 Lead compounds

References 

Bismuth
Bismuth compounds
Chemical compounds by element